The thirstiest edition of the Caribbean Series (Serie del Caribe) was held from February 3 through February 8 of  with the champion baseball teams of the Dominican Republic, Leones del Escogido; Mexico, Potros de Tijuana; Puerto Rico, Indios de Mayagüez, and Venezuela, Leones del Caracas. The format consisted of 12 games, each team facing the other teams twice, and the games were played at Estadio Quisqueya in Santo Domingo, Dominican Republic.

Summary

Final standings

Individual leaders

All-Star team

See also
Ballplayers who have played in the Series

Sources
Nuñez, José Antero (1994). Serie del Caribe de la Habana a Puerto La Cruz. JAN Editor.

External links
Estadísticas Serie del Caribe 1988 (Spanish)

Caribbean Series
1988
International baseball competitions hosted by the Dominican Republic
Sport in Santo Domingo
1988 in Dominican Republic sport
Caribbean Series
20th century in Santo Domingo